C. J. Walker, or CJ Walker may refer to:

 Madam C. J. Walker (1867–1919), AfricanAmerican entrepreneur and activist
 C. J. Walker (basketball), (born 2001), American basketball player
 CJ Walker (basketball) (born 1997), American basketball player

See also
 Self Made (miniseries), a TV show about Madam C. J. Walker